There are a number of private schools in Canada, that provide elementary and secondary education. A number of private universities and colleges in Canada. The private education network in Canada is managed according to the requirements of the provincial laws applying to private education.

A number of private schools are based around a particular philosophy of education, such as Montessori, Waldorf, or some schools related to a particular religious community.  Private schools can be independently owned and managed, while others can be regrouped under school groups, that may can operate schools in more than one province, thus having the obligation to abide to particular provincial education laws.

History

Secondary education
During the formation of Canada there were two opposing regions, the French Lower Canada (FLC) and the British Upper Canada (BUC). Within these regions, two types of schooling systems emerged: the French Catholic system (developed from the French Lower Canada) and the English Protestant system (developed from the British Upper Canada). The FLC schooling system promoted the integration of the French language, culture and Catholicism. They limited advanced education to the clergy and those training for a profession, however most of the schools were funded by the church. On the other hand, the BUC schooling system promoted that they were not affiliated to any specific religion. However, after analyzing the curriculum and values embedded within this system, it is clear that they were tied to Christianity. However, a key feature of the BUC schooling system was the implementation of tuition. Tuition limited school attendance to the wealthy, which could be argued to be the basis of private school tuition in Canada.

Upper Canada College (UCC) is one of the best known private secondary schools in Canada. This is because the school has managed to continue educating Canada's social and economic elite, due to rising tuition costs. Private secondary schools are separate entities from the public education system in the sense that their funding is often based on tuition and private donors. Tuition rates vary by school region and can fluctuate year to year. Tuition ranges from $31,000- $62,000. Thus, making UCC one of the most expensive yet prestigious private schools in Canada.

Private tuition costs have been continuously rising, which can be attributed to the reproduction of classism and educational inequalities in society. Tuition costs for private secondary education can be seen as only attainable by family who has high economic status. This is occurring because the cost of living in Canada rising, while the median annual income of families is staying on a stable trajectory. This means that families have to spend more on costs of living (such as rent, groceries, etc.) while their incomes stay the same, meaning they are unable to additionally compensate for private school education. In Toronto, the median income is $83,020 (2017). Comparing that to UCC's annual tuition it is clear that the average earning household cannot sustain the educational lifestyle while sustaining a balanced life at home (insurance, groceries, etc.) thus, those at the highest earning incomes are able to sustain a prestigious level of education which is reproduced for them in the future.

Despite the rising tuition costs, private education provides a multitude of benefits such as smaller class sizes, additional support (gifted, special needs, etc.) as well as prioritized interpersonal relationships. Specifically one of the benefits of having family members attending UCC is the decrease in tuition fees due to generational attendance. Historically, the tuition costs for ones ancestors attending UCC have been greater. A portion of this tuition was saved by UCC in attempts to alleviate financial stress for future generations. For example, if one's grandfather attended UCC, their father's tuition could be cut by ~15%, and then the current students tuition could be cut by an addition ~10-15%. This is an attempt to increase financial accessibility as well maintaining generational attendance which many other private secondary schools are aiming to attain as well.

Post-secondary education

An important distinction within technical colleges in Canada lies in the accreditation of some of these schools for the Canada Student Loans Program, which applies in several provinces (except for Quebec, Northwest Territories, and Nunavut). The accreditation of a technical college affects the amount that can be granted to a student through the Canada Student Loan Program.

The influence of some American ideas of education is sensible within the private education network in Canada, as the recent opening of a liberal arts university shows (Quest University), and to the creation of education groups alike some education groups in the United States, along with the presence of American education groups in Canada - for instance, the one owning the Everest Colleges in Ontario.  Some education groups limit their activities to a single scope - like technical training, for instance, or within a single province - while others lead more diversified activities, such as general education, technical training and even university education.  School transactions between education groups might happen. More than one education group is active on the international level.  The National Association of Career Colleges regroups only a small part of private career colleges in Canada.

Types of private schools

Charter schools 
There are 13 charter schools and 23 charter school campuses, all located in Alberta, Canada and have been operating in the province's education system since 1994  Charter schools have a degree of self-governance, but not total control as they are publicly funded and tuition free. They got the name "Charter School" as they follow a charter that has rules and goals for the students to accomplish, and they deliver education in a specialized way which is thought to enhance student learning.

Faith-based schools 
There are many types of faith-based schools in Canada, such as Anglican, Baptist, Christian, Catholic, Jewish, and Islamic. Within these faith-based schools, there are single-sex schooling as well as co-ed schools. Prior to the 1900s, single-sex faith-based schools were more common as schools were catered towards males. The first private-Catholic school in Canada was founded in 1867 and is called Bishop Strachan School, it was catered towards the "whole girl" and is a boarding school.

Independent schools 
Independent schools are also known typically as 'private schools', they are independently funded and ran, therefore they are under their own jurisdiction and do not have to abide by provincial educational laws. They have their own governance that is privately elected which ensures their institutions are sustained.

This list of the different types of private schools is not exhaustive, however, it serves to showcase the multitude of schools that are available for the public.

See also
Canadian Accredited Independent Schools
Education in Canada
List of Canada-accredited schools abroad
Student loans in Canada

References